Meganola is a genus of moths of the family Nolidae. The genus was erected by Harrison Gray Dyar Jr. in 1898. It is sometimes considered a synonym of Roeselia.

Species

 Meganola albula (Denis & Schiffermüller, 1775)
 Meganola alteroscota Toulgoët, 1982
 Meganola apiensis Holloway, 2003
 Meganola arcanalis (Toulgoët, 1961)
 Meganola argentescens (Hampson, 1895)
 Meganola argyraspis (Draudt, 1918)
 Meganola argyria (Hampson, 1894)
 Meganola ascripta (Hampson, 1894)
 Meganola atypica (Dyar, 1914)
 Meganola basalactifera Holloway, 2003
 Meganola basifascia (Inoue, 1958)
 Meganola basifusca (Bethune-Baker, 1904)
 Meganola biangulata (Toulgoët, 1954)
 Meganola biconigera (Draudt, 1918)
 Meganola bifiliferata (Walker, [1863])
 Meganola bifuscalis Toulgoët, 1982
 Meganola bilineata (Reich, 1936)
 Meganola bilineatalis (Toulgoët, 1961)
 Meganola bryophilalis (Staudinger, 1887)
 Meganola bryophiloides (Butler, 1882)
 Meganola canescens (Draudt, 1918)
 Meganola caruscula (Dyar, 1922)
 Meganola castigata (Dognin, 1923)
 Meganola causta (Hampson, 1900)
 Meganola conspicua Dyar, 1898
 Meganola convexalis (Toulgoët, 1961)
 Meganola costalis (Staudinger, 1887)
 Meganola costiplagiata (Hampson, 1918)
 Meganola costisquamosa (Toulgoët, 1954)
 Meganola cramboidalis Toulgoët, 1982
 Meganola cretacea (Hampson, 1914)
 Meganola cuneifera (Walker, 1862)
 Meganola decaryi (Toulgoët, 1955)
 Meganola decepta (Schaus, 1911)
 Meganola deglupta (Draudt, 1918)
 Meganola dentata Dyar, 1899
 Meganola denticulata (Moore, 1888)
 Meganola dilutalis (Toulgoët, 1961)
 Meganola discisignata (Hampson, 1896)
 Meganola divisoides (Schaus, 1905)
 Meganola dognini (Rothschild, 1916)
 Meganola effusa (Draudt, 1918)
 Meganola emissa (Dyar, 1915)
 Meganola erythrinalis (Toulgoët, 1961)
 Meganola excelsior (Draudt, 1918)
 Meganola flavibasis (Hampson, 1900)
 Meganola flaviscapula (Draudt, 1918)
 Meganola flexilineata (Wileman, 1916)
 Meganola fumosa (Butler, 1879)
 Meganola funebralis (Toulgoët, 1961)
 Meganola fuscula (Grote, 1881)
 Meganola gallicola (Wiltshire, 1949)
 Meganola gibeauxi Toulgoët, 1982
 Meganola gigantoides (Inoue, 1961)
 Meganola gigantula (Staudinger, 1879)
 Meganola gigas (Butler, 1884)
 Meganola godalma (Draudt, 1918)
 Meganola grisea (Reuch, 1933)
 Meganola hemizona (Hampson, 1911)
 Meganola heteromorpha Hacker, 2012
 Meganola heteroscota (Toulgoët, 1954)
 Meganola hypopecta (Dyar, 1914)
 Meganola hypenoides (Talbot, 1929)
 Meganola incana (Saalmüller, 1884)
 Meganola incertalis Toulgoët, 1982
 Meganola indistincta (Hampson, 1894)
 Meganola inexpectalis (Toulgoët, 1961)
 Meganola infumatalis Toulgoët, 1982
 Meganola infuscata (Hampson, 1903)
 Meganola infuscatalis (Toulgoët, 1961)
 Meganola inga (Schaus, 1921)
 Meganola insolitalis Toulgoët, 1982
 Meganola integralis Toulgoët, 1982
 Meganola leucogramma (Dognin, 1912)
 Meganola leucomelas (Toulgoët, 1954)
 Meganola leucostola (Hampson, 1900)
 Meganola longiventris (Poujade, 1886)
 Meganola lucia (Son, 1933)
 Meganola maculata (Staudinger, 1887)
 Meganola manoboides Holloway, 2003
 Meganola manula (Wiltshire, 1961)
 Meganola marojejy Toulgoët, 1982
 Meganola medialis (Toulgoët, 1961)
 Meganola mediofascia (Inoue, 1958)
 Meganola mediofracta (Toulgoët, 1954)
 Meganola mediolinealis (Toulgoët, 1961)
 Meganola medioscripta (Schaus, 1899)
 Meganola mediozona (Dognin, 1899)
 Meganola melanosticta (Hampson, 1914)
 Meganola melletes (Dyar, 1914)
 Meganola mesotherma (Hampson, 1914)
 Meganola metaleuca (Hampson, 1900)
 Meganola micans (Hampson, 1900)
 Meganola micropecta (Dyar, 1914)
 Meganola mikabo (Inoue, 1970)
 Meganola millotalis (Toulgoët, 1965)
 Meganola minor Dyar, 1899
 Meganola minuscula (Zeller, 1872)
 Meganola modestalis (Toulgoët, 1961)
 Meganola monticola (Roepke, 1948)
 Meganola nanula (Toulgoët, 1954)
 Meganola nepheloleuca (Hampson, 1914)
 Meganola nigrobasalis (Rothschild, 1916)
 Meganola nigromixtalis (Toulgoët, 1961)
 Meganola nitida (Hampson, 1894)
 Meganola nitidoides Holloway, 2003
 Meganola niveicosta (Schaus, 1905)
 Meganola nivitalis (Toulgoët, 1965)
 Meganola nudalis (Toulgoët, 1961)
 Meganola oblita (Wileman & West, 1929)
 Meganola pallidiceps (Hampson, 1907)
 Meganola palpalis (Toulgoët, 1961)
 Meganola paulianalis (Toulgoët, 1961)
 Meganola pecta (Dyar, 1914)
 Meganola perangulata (Hampson, 1900)
 Meganola pernitens (Schaus, 1911)
 Meganola phylla (Dyar, 1898)
 Meganola pictalis Toulgoët, 1982
 Meganola placens (Schaus, 1911)
 Meganola plumatella (Druce, 1885)
 Meganola polydonta (Schaus, 1905)
 Meganola protigagas (Inoue, 1970)
 Meganola pseudermana (Dyar, 1918)
 Meganola pseudomajor (Toulgoët, 1965)
 Meganola pulverata (Wileman & West, 1929)
 Meganola pulverea (Dognin, 1912)
 Meganola punctilinea (Draudt, 1918)
 Meganola pygmaea (Hampson, 1900)
 Meganola pyralidoides (Reich, 1933)
 Meganola recurvata (Dognin, 1914)
 Meganola rubiginealis (Toulgoët, 1961)
 Meganola rufescens (Dognin, 1899)
 Meganola rufomixtalis (Toulgoët, 1961)
 Meganola saalmuelleri (Toulgoët, 1961)
 Meganola sabulosa (Schaus, 1911)
 Meganola satoi (Inoue, 1970)
 Meganola scripta (Moore, 1888)
 Meganola scriptoides Holloway, 2003
 Meganola scriptrix (Eecke, 1926)
 Meganola semicrema (Draudt, 1918)
 Meganola semirufa (Hampson, 1894)
 Meganola shimekii (Inoue, 1970)
 Meganola sogalis (Toulgoët, 1965)
 Meganola spodia Franclemont, 1985
 Meganola stictigramma (Dognin, 1912)
 Meganola stigmatica (Reich, 1936)
 Meganola stilbina (Draudt, 1918)
 Meganola strigivena (Hampson, 1894)
 Meganola strigula (Denis & Schiffermüller, 1775)
 Meganola subalbalis (Zeller, 1852)
 Meganola subgigas Inoue, 1982
 Meganola taurica (Daniel, 1935)
 Meganola tessellalis Toulgoët, 1982
 Meganola togatulalis (Hübner, 1796)
 Meganola triangulalis (Leech, 1888)
 Meganola trianguloquelinea (Eecke, 1920)
 Meganola trias (Schaus, 1921)
 Meganola unilinea (Schaus, 1911)
 Meganola varia (Barnes & Lindsey, 1921)
 Meganola venosalis (Toulgoët, 1954)
 Meganola venusta (Brandt, 1938)
 Meganola venustula (Toulgoët, 1954)
 Meganola versicolora (Dognin, 1907)
 Meganola viettealis Toulgoët, 1982
 Meganola vieui (Toulgoët, 1961)

External links
 

Nolinae